The Sun Fast 32i is a French sailboat that was designed by Philippe Briand as a racer-cruiser and first built in 2001.

The "i" in the designation indicates that the deck is injection-molded.

The Sun Fast 32i is part of the Sun Fast sailboat range and a development of the Sun Odyssey 32i, using a taller mast, deeper keel and upgraded racing hardware.

Production
The design was built by Jeanneau in France, from 2001 to 2007, but it is now out of production.

Design
The Sun Fast 32i is a recreational keelboat, built predominantly of fiberglass. The hull is made from single-skin fiberglass polyester, while the deck is injection molded fiberglass polyester. It has a 9/10 fractional sloop rig, with a keel-stepped mast, two sets of spreaders and aluminum spars with Dyform rigging. The hull has a nearly-plumb stem, a walk-through reverse transom, an internally mounted spade-type rudder controlled by a tiller and a fixed fin keel with a swept weight bulb. It displaces  and carries  of ballast.

The design has sleeping accommodation for six people, with a double "V"-berth in the bow cabin, an "L"-shaped settee and a straight settee in the main cabin and an aft cabin with a double berth on the port side. The galley is located on the starboard side at the companionway ladder. The galley is "U"-shaped and is equipped with a two-burner stove, ice box and a sink. A navigation station is opposite the galley, on the port side. The head is located amidships.

Operational history
The boat was at one time supported by a class club that organized racing events, the Sun Fast Association.

In a 2003 review in Sailing World, Tony Bessinger concluded, "the Sun Fast 32i is a great fit for a prospective owner looking for a sensible way to accomplish several different yachting tasks. Since it's not a flat-out macho racing machine, it won't intimidate or terrify beginning to intermediate-level racers or their friends and family. And while cruising isn't something we do a lot of, we can see the potential for comfortable weekends in the large interior, which sailors who live far from where their boat is kept will appreciate. All in all, the Sun Fast 32i is more Clark Kent than Superman, but remember that old Clark could still hold his own against bad guys and attracted a lot less attention than the fellow in the red cape."

See also
List of sailing boat types

Related development
Sun Odyssey 32i

References

External links

Keelboats
2000s sailboat type designs
Sailing yachts
Sailboat type designs by Philippe Briand
Sailboat types built by Jeanneau